Coedffranc Central is an electoral ward of Neath Port Talbot county borough, Wales.  Coedffranc Central is a part of the Coedffranc community and falls within the parliamentary constituency of Aberavon.

Coedffranc Central is bounded by the wards of Coedffranc West to the southwest; Coedffranc North to the north; Dyffryn to the east; and Neath East and Briton Ferry West to the south east.  Almost all the ward is built up consisting of residential areas and shopping streets covering the centre of the village of Skewen.

Coedffranc Central was an electoral ward of West Glamorgan until 4 May 1989, when Coedffranc Central and Coedffranc West became a Coedffranc ward under The County of West Glamorgan (Electoral Arrangements) Order 1989. Coedffranc Central and Coedffranc West were recreated for the 1995 elections.

Local council elections 

In the 2022 local council elections, the results were:

In the 2017 local council elections, the results were:

In the 2012 local council elections, the electorate turnout was 32.49%.  The results were:

References 

Electoral wards of Neath Port Talbot
Electoral wards of West Glamorgan